Texas Proposition 1 may refer to various ballot measures in Texas, including:

2007 Texas Proposition 1
2021 Texas Proposition 1